Hooser is an unincorporated community in Dexter Township, Cowley County, Kansas, United States.

History
A post office was opened in Hooser in 1887, and remained in operation until it was discontinued in 1944.

Hooser was a station on the Missouri Pacific Railroad. In 1910, it contained a population of 23.

Education
The community is served by Dexter USD 471 public school district.

References

Further reading

External links
 Cowley County maps: Current, Historic, KDOT

Unincorporated communities in Cowley County, Kansas
Unincorporated communities in Kansas